University Park is a 
neighborhood in the South Los Angeles region of  Los Angeles, California. It is the home of the University of Southern California (USC),  Mount St. Mary's College and Hebrew Union College. Additionally, the neighborhood is the home of the historic Shrine Auditorium.

Geography

University Park is flanked by Pico-Union on the north, Downtown Los Angeles on the northeast, Historic South Central on the east, the Exposition Park neighborhood on the south and west and Adams-Normandie on the west.

Population

University Park is one of the most ethnically diverse neighborhoods in Los Angeles, with a diversity index of 0.676. "The diversity index measures the probability that any two residents, chosen at random, would be of different ethnicities. If all residents are of the same ethnic group it's zero. If half are from one group and half from another it's .50."

Latinos made up 47.7% of the population, with white people at 25.5%, Asians at 16.1%, black people at 7%,  and others at 3.8%.  Mexico and El Salvador were the most common places of birth for the 42.4% of the residents who were born abroad, an average percentage of foreign-born when compared with the city as a whole.

A total of 23,596 people lived in University Park's 1.17 square miles, according to the 2000 U.S. census—averaging 20,217 people per square mile, among the highest population densities in the city as a whole. Population was estimated at 25,181 in 2008. The median age was 23, considered young when compared to the city as a whole. The percentage of residents aged 19 to 34 was among the county's highest.

The $16,533 median household income in 2008 dollars was considered low for the city and county. The percentage of households earning $20,000 or less (56.6%) was the second-largest in Los Angeles County, outplaced only by Downtown Los Angeles. The average household size of 2.7 people was average for the city. Renters occupied 92.2% of the housing units, and homeowners occupied the rest.

In 2000 there were 590 families headed by single parents, or 20.3%, a rate that was high for the county and the city. The percentages of never-married women (61.5) and never-married men (67.2) were among the county's  highest.

In the same year there were 198 military veterans, or 1% of the population, considered low when compared to the city and county as a whole.

Education

Just 23.7% of University Park residents aged 25 or older had completed a four-year degree in 2000, about average when compared with the city and the county at large, but the percentage of those residents with less than a high school diploma was high for the county. The percentage of the same residents with a master's degree or higher was also high for the county.

The schools within University Park's boundaries are:

Post-secondary
 University of Southern California
 Mount St. Mary's University, Doheny Campus, a private, independent, Catholic university, home to the graduate degree programs, associate in arts programs, education credential program, and Weekend College – a baccalaureate degree program designed for working adults.
 Hebrew Union College, for training rabbis, cantors, educators and communal workers in Reform Judaism

Secondary and primary

 New Designs Charter School—university park, LAUSD, high school, 12714 South Avalon Boulevard
 Alliance Richard Merkin Middle School, LAUSD charter, 2023 Union Avenue
 Downtown Value School, LAUSD charter elementary, 950 West Washington Boulevard
 Norwood Street Elementary School, LAUSD, 2020 Oak Street
 Star Christian School, private, 2120 Estrella Avenue
 Frank Lanterman School, LAUSD special education, 2328 Saint James Place
 Divine Providence Day Nursery and Kindergarten, private elementary, 2620 Monmouth Avenue
 Saint Vincent Elementary School, private, 2333 South Figueroa Street
 Thirty-Second Street USC Performing Arts, LAUSD alternative, 822 West 32nd Street

Recreation and parks

 Hoover Recreation Center, 1010 West 25th Street, includes an auditorium equipped with a studio floor and stage, three meeting rooms, kitchen, private outdoor courtyard  with children's play area, basketball courts, outdoor fitness equipment, walking/running paths, picnic tables and barbecue pits.
 St. James Park, Adams Boulevard and Severance Street, pocket park

Facilities
 The Shrine Auditorium, a large-event  and entertainment venue and the headquarters of the Al Malaikah Shrine Temple
 University Village shopping center, West Jefferson Boulevard at Hoover Street. Demolished in 2014.
  California Highway Patrol station beneath the Santa Monica Freeway-Harbor Freeway interchange

Transportation
The Metro E Line serves the neighborhood, with stations at 23rd Street, Jefferson Blvd./USC, Exposition Park/USC and Exposition Blvd./Vermont Avenue.

Notable residents

 Newell Mathews (ca. 1833–1907) 19th Century businessman and member of the Los Angeles Common Council
 Frank Sabichi (1842–1900), attorney, land developer, member of the Common Council
 Ygnacio Sepulveda (1842–1916), Superior Court judge, 2639 Monmouth Avenue

References

External links

 University Park USC
  University Park crime map and statistics

 
Neighborhoods in Los Angeles
South Los Angeles